Futebol Clube Bravos do Maquis, formerly Futebol Clube Onze Bravos and usually known simply as Bravos do Maquis, is an Angolan football club based in Luena, in the eastern province of Moxico.

Achievements
Angola Cup: 
Winner: (1) 2015
Runnerup: 
Angola Super Cup: 
Winner: (0)
Runner-up: (1) 2016

Recent seasons
F.C. Bravos do Maquis's season-by-season performance since 2011:

 PR = Preliminary round, 1R = First round, GS = Group stage, R32 = Round of 32, R16 = Round of 16, QF = Quarter-finals, SF = Semi-finals, RU = Runner-Up, W = Winner

League and cup positions

Stadium
They play their home games at the Estádio Jones Cufuna Mundunduleno. The 4300-seat stadium was inaugurated on 13 November 2006.

Players and staff

Players

Staff

Manager history and performance

See also
 Girabola
 Gira Angola

External links
 Official site
 Squad at official website 
 Girabola.com profile
 Zerozero.pt profile
 Facebook profile

References

Football clubs in Angola
Sports clubs in Angola